Alt Penedès is a comarca (county) in Catalonia, northern Spain. The capital is Vilafranca del Penedès.

Municipalities

References

External links
Official website 

 
Comarques of the Province of Barcelona